Goasdoué is a surname, and may refer to;

Goasdoué means man of God in Breton and derives from gwaz which means man and doue which means God. (cf. Gwaz and Doue)

  - French actor
 Jean-Jacques Goasdoué - French businessman, founder of Transports Frigorifiques Européens
  - Breton musician
 Yves Goasdoué - French politician

Breton-language surnames